General elections were held in the Solomon Islands on 5 April 2006. No party won more than four of the fifty seats, while thirty seats went to independent candidates. A number of those subsequently formed an Association of Independent Members of Parliament, with Snyder Rini as their leader. Rini was elected Prime Minister by Parliament on 18 April, amidst "widespread street protests" in Honiara, which caused particular damage in the city's Chinatown. Rioters "alleged corruption and insisted that Mr. Rini had been unfairly favouring Chinese businessmen". While the riots ceased with the arrival of Australian and New Zealand peacekeeping troops the next day, the opposition soon lodged a motion of no confidence in Rini's premiership. Rini resigned on 26 April, having been Prime Minister for just eight days. Opposition parties united in a coalition and succeeded in having Manasseh Sogavare, of the Solomon Islands Social Credit Party, elected Prime Minister on 4 May.

Conduct
Australia sent a ten-member observer delegation to monitor the election, led by Senator Marise Payne, and comprising MPs Bob Sercombe and Michael Ferguson, former Queensland Electoral Commissioner Bob Longland, and six experienced officials from the Departments of Foreign Affairs and Trade, Defence and AusAID. The Australian observer delegation was joined by other international observer teams from New Zealand, Japan, the USA, the Commonwealth Secretariat and the Pacific Islands Forum Secretariat. The United Nations Electoral Assistance Division coordinated the consolidated international observer effort. The international observers' interim assessment said the polling process was transparent and well-conducted, and voters were able to exercise a free and secret vote.

Results
Twenty-six women candidates stood in the election, but none were elected, making the Solomons' Parliament one of the world's few all-male legislatures.

References

Solomon Islands
Elections in the Solomon Islands
2006 in the Solomon Islands
Election and referendum articles with incomplete results